Woodham Academy (formerly Woodham Community Technology College and originally Woodham Comprehensive School) is often simply referred to as Woodham and is an 11–16 mixed secondary school with academy status in Newton Aycliffe, County Durham, England. It was formerly a foundation school that was established in 1970 and adopted its present name after becoming an academy in 2012. The school is part of the Eden Learning Trust.

History

Woodham Comprehensive School: 1970 to 1999 

Woodham Comprehensive was a foundation school that opened on 29 June 1970 by Alice Bacon, Baroness Bacon, a former Labour MP. It was built under the Consortium of Local Authorities Special Programme.

As well as Woodham and Greenfield schools there was a third secondary school in Newton Aycliffe called "The Avenue Comprehensive" which was closed in 1992 and amalgamated with Woodham. It was created from two former secondary schools; Marlowe Hall Secondary Modern School and Milton Hall.

On 4 July 1990, the school was set alight by arsonists. Around a third of the school's teaching area was destroyed and an estimated £1 million of damage was caused. The damaged section of the school was rebuilt and reopened on 12 December 1992.

Woodham Community Technology College: 1999 to 2012 

Woodham gained Technology College status in 1999 and was opened by Kate Adie.

In March 2008, Woodham Community Technology College (often written as Woodham CTC) announced the closure of its sixth form provision due to low applications but remained committed to current sixth form students.

The Woodham Warriors were the school's American flag football team from 2003  to around 2014 and won many tournaments and accolades, including representing the UK in 2005

School rebuild
The school was scheduled for a complete rebuild but the government axed the Building Schools for the Future rebuilding programme in July, 2010

House system
In September 2011, the Woodham house system was re-introduced for year seven to ten. The houses were named after local castles. The houses are Brancepeth, Lambton, and Raby. Students collect points for their house by working hard and taking part in extracurricular activities. In 2015 there was no house captains or head of house due to the departure of two of the head of houses and all the house captains.
The house system was eventually retired.

Woodham Academy: September 2012 to present 
In March 2012, the school announced it would be submitting a request to turn the school into an academy. In July 2012, it opened its Sports Academy which aims to offer "high quality coaching opportunities to elite athletes in a range of sports" The school introduced a new uniform in September 2012 for the new Academy.

In July 2021 it was announced that Woodham was amongst 50 schools nationally to be considered for a major rebuild, partial rebuild or refurbishment under the School Rebuilding Programme with the Government's decision expected early 2022.

Facilities 
The school has a range of facilities including 

 9 science laboratories
 2 music suites
 a technology complex with 6 specialist workshops
 a textiles studio
 a sports hall
 a gymnasium
 a drama studio
 a swimming pool 
 multiple IT suites

Academic performance

Curriculum provision
Woodham offers a broad range of learning experiences that meet the needs of learners, engage them and maximise their opportunities to achieve well. Pupils learn about a variety of employment sectors and routes into further education. The range of external qualifications is suitably varied to support pupils’ aspirations 

The school offers a range of GCSE and vocational qualifications.

Progress 8 comparison with other local schools 

Results from 2020 and 2021 were not published due to exam disruptions caused by the COVID pandemic.

The UTC is a was a new school and therefore the first published results were 2018.

Ofsted report judgements  

 2018 - Good
 2016 - Requires Improvement
 2011 - Good
 2009 - Satisfactory
 2006 - Satisfactory

Head teachers 
Head teachers of the school are:

 John Pearson (OBE), 1970–1980
 Katherine Carr, 1980–1990
 Andrew Bennett, 1990–1994
 Steven Harness, 1994–2010
 Christine Forsyth, 2010–2019
 Andrew Bell, 2019–present

Notable alumni 
 Kate Avery, long-distance runner
 Darren Craddock, footballer 
 Mark Gatiss, actor, comedian, screenwriter and novelist
 Paul Magrs, writer and lecturer
 Scott Mann, film director
 Chris Mason, footballer 
 Jason Steele, footballer
 Ross Turnbull, footballer
 Lewis Wing, footballer 
 Angela Winstanley-Smith, water polo player

Gallery

Notes 
  Position name changed to "Principal" in 2010.

References

External links 
 

Eden Learning Trust
Newton Aycliffe
Secondary schools in County Durham
Academies in County Durham
School buildings in the United Kingdom destroyed by arson
Educational institutions established in 1970
1970 establishments in England